Shadbad may refer to:
 Shadbad-e Mashayekh
 Shadbad-e Olya